Thomas Cundy may refer to one of three English architects, father, son and grandson:

Thomas Cundy (senior) (1765–1825) 
Thomas Cundy (junior) (1790–1867) 
Thomas Cundy III (1821–1895)